Double Trouble is an album by American country music artists George Jones and Johnny Paycheck released in 1980 on the Epic Records label. The album consists of covers of rock and roll hits from the 1950s and 1960s, with the exception of the opening track, "When You're Ugly Like Us (You Just Naturally Got to Be Cool)", an original song. Double Trouble is Jones and Paycheck's only duet album.

Background
Paycheck had played bass for Jones as part of the Jones Boys in the 1960s. The production, by Billy Sherrill, has Sherrill's trademark "countrypolitan" sound and includes a female chorus on some songs.

Reception

Although the album stalled on the Billboard charts at number 45, the Chuck Berry song "Maybellene" peaked at number 7 on the country singles chart. "You Can Have Her" and "You Better Move On" were also minor hits.

Stephen Thomas Erlewine of AllMusic observes, "The pair sound as if they were on one of their notorious drinking and drugging binges, making jokes with each other throughout every song (except the closing "You Better Move On") and singing without regard for key." He also calls it "easily the worst album George Jones ever recorded."

Track listing

Personnel
George Jones – vocals
Johnny Paycheck - Vocals
Billy Sanford – guitar
Cliff Parker – guitar
Tommy Allsup - guitar
Phil Baugh - electric guitar
Jim Murphy – pedal steel guitar
Stephen R. Shaffer – bass guitar
Jerry Kroon – drums
Bobby Wood – piano
Diane Tidwell, Janie Fricke, Joe Bias, Judy Anderson, Nick DeStefano, The Nashville Edition - backing vocals
Technical
Lou Bradley, Ron Reynolds - engineer
Slick Lawson - photography

Singles

References

External links
 George Jones' Official Website
 Johnny PayCheck's Official Website
 Record Label

1980 albums
George Jones albums
Johnny Paycheck albums
Vocal duet albums
Albums produced by Billy Sherrill
Epic Records albums